The 1891 Brown Bears football team represented Brown University as an independent during the 1891 college football season. The team compiled a record of 4–6.

Schedule

References

Brown
Brown Bears football seasons
Brown Bears football